Transnefteproduct (Russian: Транснефтепродукт) is an operator of oil products pipelines headquartered in Moscow, Russia. It operates more than  oil pipelines.  It was established by the Government of the Russian Federation on 30 August 1993. On 16 April 2007, Transnefteproduct became a subsidiary of an oil pipelines operator Transneft.

References

External links

 

Oil pipeline companies
Oil companies of Russia
Transneft